Aneulophus is a genus of flowering plants belonging to the family Erythroxylaceae.

Its native range is Western Central Tropical Africa.

Species:
 Aneulophus africanus Benth. 
 Aneulophus congoensis Gram

References

Erythroxylaceae
Malpighiales genera